Minakami may refer to:

 Minakami, Gunma, a town in Gunma Prefecture, Japan
 Minakami Station, a railway station in Gunma Prefecture, Japan
 Minakami (train), a train service running in Japan
 Takitarō Minakami (1887–1940), a Japanese novelist
 Tsutomu Minakami (1919–2004), a Japanese author
 Minakami Houdaigi, a ski resort in Gunma Prefecture, Japan